Morgantown is a small, unincorporated community crossroads village in central Benton Township, Pike County, Ohio, United States. Located at the junction of Morgans Fork and Auerville Roads, it once possessed a school and a store.  Today, the community consists of a few houses and the Morgantown Church of Christ in Christian Union.

Gallery

References

Unincorporated communities in Pike County, Ohio
Unincorporated communities in Ohio